The 1937 Belgian Grand Prix was a motor race held at Spa-Francorchamps on 11 July 1937. It was the last Grand Prix to be held at the circuit's original configuration.

Classification

References

Belgian Grand Prix
Belgian Grand Prix
Grand Prix, 1937